Dutch Ridge Historic District is a national historic district located in Perry Township, Allen County, Indiana.  The district encompasses two contributing buildings and one contributing site in Perry Township. They are the Perry Township District School #1, or Dutch Ridge School (1888) with Queen Anne style design elements and the Late Gothic Revival style Salem Reformed Church (1876).  Also located in the district is the Dutch Ridge Cemetery.

It was listed on the National Register of Historic Places in 1995.

References

External links

Historic districts on the National Register of Historic Places in Indiana
Gothic Revival architecture in Indiana
Queen Anne architecture in Indiana
Buildings and structures in Allen County, Indiana
National Register of Historic Places in Allen County, Indiana